Bassan may refer to:

 Bassan, a commune in the Hérault department in the Occitanie region in southern France

People 
 Danni Bassan (born 1955), Israeli musician
 Jean Bassan, French writer and dramatists
 Raphaël Bassan (born 1948), French film critic and journalist

Other 
 Bassan tribe,  a tribe of the Ijaw people lives in western Bayelsa State, Nigeria
 Les Fous de Bassan,  Canadian drama film, directed by Yves Simoneau and released in 1986
 Bassan-Gué BN4 night bomber,  a French night bomber designed in 1918 to the BN3/4 specification from the STAe

See also 
 Bassano (disambiguation)